XHBTA-FM is a radio station on 92.9 FM in Bahía de Tortugas, Baja California Sur.

History
XHBTA received its concession on February 26, 1996.

References

Radio stations in Baja California Sur
Radio stations established in 1996